Cichowski is a Polish habitational surname for someone from a place called Cichowo or Cichów. Notable people with the surname include:

 Gene Cichowski (born 1934), American football player
 Kazimierz Cichowski (1887–1937), Polish-Soviet communist activist and politician
 Tom Cichowski (1944–2015), American football player

Polish toponymic surnames